The Spanish treasure fleet, or West Indies Fleet (also called silver fleet or plate fleet; from the  meaning "silver"), was a convoy system of sea routes organized by the Spanish Empire from 1566 to 1790, which linked Spain with its territories in the Americas across the Atlantic. The convoys were general purpose cargo fleets used for transporting a wide variety of items, including agricultural goods, lumber, various metal resources such as silver and gold, gems, pearls, spices, sugar, tobacco, silk, and other exotic goods from the overseas territories of the Spanish Empire to the Spanish mainland. Spanish goods such as oil, wine, textiles, books and tools were transported in the opposite direction.

The West Indies fleet was the first permanent transatlantic trade route in history. Similarly, the related Manila galleon trade was the first permanent trade route across the Pacific. The Spanish West and East Indies fleets are considered among the most successful naval operations in history and, from a commercial point of view, they made possible key components of today's global economic system.

History

Origin
 
Spanish ships had carried goods from the New World since Christopher Columbus's first expedition of 1492. The organized system of convoys dates from 1564, but Spain sought to protect shipping prior to that by organizing protection around the largest Caribbean island, Cuba, and the maritime region of southern Spain and the Canary Islands because of attacks by pirates and foreign navies. In the 1560s, the Spanish government created a system of convoys in response to the sacking of Havana by French privateers.

The main procedures were established based on the recommendations of Pedro Menéndez de Avilés, an experienced admiral and personal adviser of King Philip II. The treasure fleets sailed along two sea lanes. The main one was the Caribbean Spanish West Indies fleet or Flota de Indias, which departed in two convoys from Seville, where the Casa de Contratación was based, bound for ports such as Veracruz, Portobelo and Cartagena before making a rendezvous at Havana in order to return together to Spain. A secondary route was that of the Manila Galleons or Galeón de Manila, which linked the Philippines to Acapulco in Mexico across the Pacific Ocean.  From Acapulco, the Asian goods were transhipped by mule train to Veracruz to be loaded onto the Caribbean treasure fleet for shipment to Spain. To better defend this trade, Pedro Menéndez de Avilés and Álvaro de Bazán designed the definitive model of the galleon in the 1550s.

Casa de Contratación

Spain controlled the trade through the Casa de Contratación based in Seville, a river port in southern Spain. By law, the colonies could trade only with Seville, the one designated port in the mother country. Maritime archaeology has shown that the quantity of goods transported was sometimes higher than that recorded at the Archivo General de Indias. Spanish merchants and Spaniards acting as fronts (cargadores) for foreign merchants sent their goods on these fleets to the New World. Some resorted to contraband to transport their cargoes untaxed. The Crown of Spain taxed the wares and precious metals of private merchants at a rate of 20%, a tax known as the quinto real or royal fifth.

By the end of the 16th century, Spain became the richest country in Europe. Much of the wealth from this trade was used by the Spanish Habsburgs to finance armies to protect its European territories in the 16th and 17th centuries against the Ottoman Empire and most of the major European powers. The flow of precious metals in and out of Spain also stimulated the European economy as a whole.

The flow of precious metals made many traders wealthy, both in Spain and abroad. As a result of the discovery of precious metals in Spanish America, Spain's money supply increased tenfold. The increase in gold and silver on the Iberian market caused high inflation in the 17th century, affecting the Spanish economy. As a consequence, the Crown was forced to delay the payment of some major debts, which had negative consequences for its creditors, mostly foreign bankers. By 1690 some of these creditors could no longer offer financial support to the Crown. The Spanish monopoly over its West and East Indies colonies lasted for over two centuries.

Decline, revival and abolition
The economic importance of exports later declined with the drop in production of the American precious metal mines, such as Potosí. However, the growth in trade was strong in the early years. Numbering 17 ships in 1550, the fleets expanded to more than 50 much larger vessels by the end of the century. By the second half of the 17th century, that number had dwindled to less than half of its peak. As economic conditions gradually recovered from the last decades of the 17th century, fleet operations slowly expanded again, once again becoming prominent during the reign of the Bourbons in the 18th century.

The Spanish trade of goods was sometimes threatened by its colonial rivals, who tried to seize islands as bases along the Spanish Main and in the Spanish West Indies. However, the Atlantic trade was largely unharmed. The English acquired small islands like St Kitts in 1624; expelled in 1629, they returned in 1639 and seized Jamaica in 1655. French pirates established themselves in Saint-Domingue in 1625, were expelled, only to return later, and the Dutch occupied Curaçao in 1634. Other losses to foreign powers came later. In 1713 as part of the Treaty of Utrecht after the War of the Spanish Succession, the Spanish crown was forced to make concessions which included trading privileges for England that violated the previous Spanish monopoly on legal trade to its colonial holdings. In 1739 during the War of Jenkin's Ear, the British admirals Francis Hosier and later Edward Vernon blockaded Portobello in an attempt to prevent the return sailing of the treasure fleet. In  1741 Vernon's campaign against Cartagena de Indias ended in defeat, with high losses of men and ships. Spain dealt with the temporary British seizures of Havana and Manila (1762–4), during the Seven Years' War, by using a larger number of smaller fleets visiting a greater variety of ports.

The end of the War of the Spanish Succession in 1713 marked the beginning of the rule of the Bourbon dynasty over the Spanish Empire, which brought with it the Bourbon Reforms. These reforms, designed to halt Spain's decline and increase tax revenue, resulted in a series of changes to the fleet system throughout the 18th century. Philip V began the reforms by sending investigators to report on conditions in Spanish America, who brought back evidence of fraud. He and following Bourbon kings, notably including Charles III, would make a concerted effort to centralize the administration of Spanish America and more efficiently tax profits from overseas trade. One of these reforms was the granting of trading monopolies for certain regions to trading companies ran by peninsulares, such as the Guipuzcoan Company. Another involved the increased use of registered ships, or navíos de registro, traveling solo outside the fleet system to transport goods. These reforms gradually decreased reliance on the escorted convoys of the fleet system. In the 1780s, Spain opened its colonies to freer trade. In 1790, the Casa de Contratación was abolished, bringing to an end the great general purpose fleets. Thereafter small groups of naval frigates were assigned specifically to transferring goods or bullion as required.

The fleets

Every year, two fleets left Spain loaded with European goods in demand in Spanish America; they were guarded by military vessels. Valuable cargo from the Americas, most significantly silver from Mexico and Peru, were sent back to Spain. Fleets of fifty or more ships sailed from Spain, one bound for the Mexican port of Veracruz and the other for Panama and Cartagena. From the Spanish ports of Seville or Cádiz, the two fleets bound for the Americas sailed together down the coast of Africa, and stopped at the Spanish territory of the Canary Islands for provisions before the voyage across the Atlantic. Once the two fleets reached the Caribbean, the fleets separated. The New Spain fleet sailed to Veracruz in Mexico to load not only silver and the valuable red dye cochineal, but also porcelain and silk shipped from China on the Manila galleons. The Asian goods were carried overland from Acapulco to Veracruz by mule train.

The Tierra Firme fleet, or galeones, sailed to Cartagena to load South American products, especially silver from Potosí. Some ships went to Portobello on the Caribbean coast of Panama to load Peruvian silver. This had been shipped from the Pacific coast port of Callao and transported across the isthmus of Panama by mule. Other ships went to the Caribbean island of Margarita, off the coast of Venezuela, to collect pearls which had been harvested from offshore oyster beds. After loading was complete, both fleets sailed for Havana, Cuba, to rendezvous for the journey back to Spain.

The overland journey by mule train, as well as supplies provided by local farmers to prepare the fleets for long ocean voyages, invigorated the economy of colonial Spanish America. Preparation and the transport of goods required porters, innkeepers, and foodstuffs to help facilitate travel. However, in Mexico in 1635, there was an increase of the sales tax levied to finance the fleet, the Armada de Barlovento.

Between 1703 and 1705 Spanish corsair Amaro Pargo began to participate in the West Indies Fleet. In this period he was the owner and captain of the frigate El Ave María y Las Ánimas, a ship which he sailed from the port of Santa Cruz de Tenerife to Havana. He reinvested the benefits of the Canarian-American trade in his estates, devoted to the cultivation of the grapevines of Malvasía and Vidueño, whose wine products (mainly Vidueño) were sent to America.

The flow of Spanish treasure
Walton gives the following figures in pesos. For the 300-year period the peso or piece of eight had about 25 grams of silver, about the same as the German thaler and Dutch rijksdaalder. A single galleon might carry 2 million pesos.  The modern approximate value of the estimated 4 billion pesos produced during the period would come to $530 billion or €470 billion (based on silver bullion prices of May 2015). Of the 4 billion pesos produced, 2.5 billion was shipped to Europe, of which 500 million was shipped around Africa to Asia. Of the remaining 1.5 billion 650 million went directly to Asia from Acapulco and 850 million remained in the Western Hemisphere. Little of the wealth stayed in Spain. Of the 11 million arriving in 1590, 2 million went to France for imports, 6 million to Italy for imports and military expenses, of which 2.5 went up the Spanish road to the Low Countries and 1 million to the Ottoman Empire. 1.5 million was shipped from Portugal to Asia. Of the 2 million pesos reaching the Dutch Republic in that year, 75% went to the Baltic for naval stores and 25% went to Asia. The income of the Spanish crown from all sources was about 2.5 million pesos in 1550, 14 million in the 1590s, about 15 million in 1760 and 30 million in 1780.  In 1665 the debts of the Spanish crown were 30 million pesos short-term and 300 million long-term. Most of the New World production was silver, but Colombian mines produced mostly gold. The following table gives the estimated legal production. It necessarily excludes smuggling, which was increasingly important after 1600. The crown legally took one fifth (quinto real) at the source and obtained more through other taxes.

Losses

Despite the general perception that many Spanish galleons were captured by foreign privateers and pirates, few fleets were actually lost to enemies in the course of the flota's two and a half centuries of operation. Only the Dutch admiral Piet Hein managed to capture an entire fleet, in the  Battle in the Bay of Matanzas in 1628, after which its cargo was taken to the Dutch Republic. The English admiral Robert Blake twice attacked the fleet, in the Battle of Cádiz in 1656 and in the Battle of Santa Cruz de Tenerife in 1657, but he managed to capture only a single galleon and Spanish officers managed to prevent most of the silver from falling into English hands. The West Indies fleet was destroyed in the Battle of Vigo Bay in 1702 during the War of the Spanish Succession, when it was surprised in port unloading its goods, but the Spanish sailors had already unloaded most of its cargo. None of these attacks took place in open seas. In the case of the Manila galleons, only four were ever captured by British warships in nearly three centuries: the Santa Anna by Thomas Cavendish in 1589, the Encarnación by Woodes Rogers in 1709, the Covadonga by George Anson in 1743, and the Santísima Trinidad in 1762. Two other British attempts were foiled by the Rosario in 1704 and the Begonia in 1710. These losses and others due to hurricanes were significant economic blows to trade.

Famous shipwrecks
Wrecks of Spanish treasure ships, whether sunk in naval combat or, as was more usually the case, by storms (with the ones which occurred 1622, 1715, 1733 and 1750 being among the worst), are a prime target for modern treasure hunters.  Many, such as the Nuestra Señora de Atocha, and the Santa Margarita have been salvaged. In August 1750, at least three Spanish merchantmen ran aground in North Carolina during a hurricane. The El Salvador sank near Cape Lookout, the Nuestra Señora De Soledad went ashore near present-day Core Banks and the Nuestra Señora De Guadalupe went ashore near present-day Ocracoke.

Encarnación
The wreck of the Spanish merchant ship Encarnación, part of the Tierra Firme fleet, was discovered in 2011 with much of its cargo still aboard and part of its hull intact. The Encarnación sank in 1681 during a storm near the mouth of the Chagres River on the Caribbean side of Panama. The Encarnación sank in less than 40 feet of water. The remains of the Urca de Lima from the 1715 fleet and the San Pedro from the 1733 fleet, after being found by treasure hunters, are now protected as Florida Underwater Archaeological Preserves.

Capitana
The Capitana (El Rubi) was the flagship of the 1733 fleet; it ran aground during a hurricane near Upper Matecumbe Key, then sank. Three men died during the storm. Afterward, divers recovered most of the treasure aboard.

The Capitana was the first of the 1733 ships to be found again in 1938. Salvage workers recovered items from the sunken ship over more than 10 years. Additional gold was recovered in June 2015. The ship's location: is 24° 55.491' north, 80° 30.891' west.

San José
The San José was sunk in 1708 by British forces near Colombian's coasts. Its wreckage was discovered in 2015 and is believed to contain the record 17B US$ in gold, silver, and other precious stones. Its place is a national secret.

Nuestra Señora de las Maravillas
The Nuestra Señora de las Maravillas (de) which had collided with another ship in the fleet suffered damage to its hull and sunk into a coral reef off the Bahamas in January 1656. The ship's cargo with almost 3.5 million items was recovered between 1650s and 1990s, while latest discoveries would be exhibited at the Bahamas Maritime Museum.

See also

 Asiento de Negros
 Álvaro de Bazán
 List of Atlantic hurricanes before 1600
 Luis Fajardo 
 Manila galleon 
 Piracy in the Caribbean
 Portuguese India Armadas
 San Esteban

Notes

Further reading
 Andrews, Kenneth R. The Spanish Caribbean: Trade and Plunder, 1530–1630. 1978.
 Fish, Shirley. The Manila-Acapulco Galleons: The Treasure Ships of the Pacific, with an Annotated List of the Transpacific Galleons 1565–1815. Central Milton Keynes, England: Authorhouse 2011.
 Fisher, John R. "Fleet System (Flota)" in Encyclopedia of Latin American History and Culture, vol. 2, p. 575. New York: Charles Scribner's Sons 1996.
 Haring, Clarence. Trade and Navigation between Spain and the Indies in the Time of the Habsburgs (1918)
 Haring, Clarence. The Spanish Empire in America New York: Oxford University Press 1947
 Murray, Paul.  The Spanish Mariners: From the Discovery of America to Trafalgar. 1492–1805. Observations and Reflections. Mexico, 1976
 Schurz, William Lytle. The Manila Galleon. New York: E. P. Dutton & Co., Inc., 1939.
 Walton, Timothy R.: The Spanish Treasure Fleets. Pineapple Press Inc, 2002. 
 Wyatt, Jack J.: Lions in the Water. Unrest Adventures, 2020. 
 Zarin, Cynthia. "Green Dreams", The New Yorker, November 21, 2005, pp. 76–83 www.newyorker.com

External links
 Attack of the Tierra Firma Fleet of 1708. Royal Geographical Society of South Australia
 Two firms seek ship, Carolina Coast Online
 Treasure hunter in race to uncover ship of riches, Google
 Philip Masters, True Amateur of History, Dies at 70, New York Times
 Shipwrecks and Treasure: the Spanish Treasure Fleet of 1750
 Treasure hunter that found Blackbeard's pirate ship sues state for $8.2 million, Fayetteville Observer
 Lawmakers enter legal battle over Blackbeard's ship, News & Observer
 Photographer suing state over Blackbeard shipwreck footage, WRAL-TV
 Blackbeard's Law would clarify control of media rights to shipwrecks, News & Record
 Controversy Over Blackbeard's Queen Anne's Revenge Continues, Public Radio East
 Battle Over Shipwreck Photos Brews in N.C., Courthouse News
 Plunder disputes plague the wreck of Blackbeard’s ship, Soundings

Treasure fleet
Treasure fleet
Treasure fleet
Sea lanes
History of New Spain
History of the Atlantic Ocean
Naval warfare
Anti-piracy
History of international trade
Age of Sail
17th century in Spain
18th century in Spain